William Mason High School, also known as Mason High School (WMHS or MHS), is a four-year public high school located in the Mason City Schools district in Mason, Ohio, a suburb of Cincinnati, Ohio.

History
Mason High School's first commencement was held May 21, 1886, at the Mason Presbyterian Church. The seven graduates completed the three-year high school program and each read their topic paper at the graduation ceremony.  Professor Louis Coleman was the school superintendent and possibly the only teacher in the high school.

Current
The current Mason High School facility opened for the 2002-03 school year with 379,000 square feet on a 73-acre campus. In 2009, a $30 million expansion project added 49 classrooms in two new, three-story wings. Opened in 2003, and connected to the high school, is the 149,000 square-foot Mason Community Center, which features an Olympic-sized competition swimming pool, therapy pools, six basketball courts, fitness rooms and exercise equipment. It was a joint project of the City of Mason and Mason City Schools.

As of the 2020-21 school year, Mason High School's enrollment is 3,507 students. It is the largest high school by enrollment in the state of Ohio.

Mason High School features 27 AP courses, College Credit Plus, a student-run bank, a renowned symphony orchestra, a speech and debate team, a student-run store, a student-run website, internships, community service, over 70 other school-sanctioned extracurriculars, 67 athletic teams, a marching band, multiple concert bands, jazz band, several concert orchestras, arts, choral and drama programs. Additionally, the award-winning Mason High School Science Olympiad team was ranked first in the nation among all high schools in both 2021 and 2022.

Athletics
The Comets participate in the Greater Miami Conference, in which they have won 15 consecutive All-Sports titles through 2021-22. Previously, Mason was a charter member of the Fort Ancient Valley Conference from 1965-66 to 2006-07.

Ohio High School Athletic Association State Championships/Team 

Boys Tennis 2021, 2019, 2018
Boys Cross Country, 2022, 2021, 2014, 2022 2008
Boys Soccer, 2013
Girls Swimming and Diving, 2019, 2018
Girls Cross Country, 2022, 2013, 2012, 2022
Girls Golf, 2010, 2009, 2008
Girls Track and Field, 2004
Girls Basketball, 2000

Non-OHSAA State Championships/Team 
 Girls Tennis, 2022, 2021, 2020, 2019, 2018, 2017 (Ohio Tennis Coaches Association tournament)
 Boys Lacrosse, 2004
 Girls Water Polo, 2013
 Boys Ultimate Frisbee, 2017

Notable alumni
Angela Bizzarri (class of 2006), NCAA national champion, 9-time All-American cross country and track runner at the University of Illinois
Percy Coleman (class of 1894), MLB pitcher
Brant Daugherty (class of 2004), actor, Pretty Little Liars, Army Wives, Dancing with the Stars
Josh Kline (class of 2008), NFL offensive lineman; member of 2015 Super Bowl-winning New England Patriots
Elijah Nkansah (class of 2013), NFL offensive lineman
Dan Patrick (class of 1974), sports broadcaster and host, NBC Sports and ESPN, TV/radio host of The Dan Patrick Show 
T. J. Zeuch (class of 2013), MLB pitcher

References

High schools in Warren County, Ohio
Public high schools in Ohio
Mason, Ohio